Lansdowne is a suburb in south-western Sydney, in the state of New South Wales, Australia. Lansdowne is located 27 kilometres west of the Sydney central business district, in the local government area of the City of Canterbury-Bankstown and is part of the South-western Sydney region. Its western boundary is Prospect Creek, the north the Hume Highway and the east and south Georges Hall.

History
Lansdowne took its name from the Lansdowne Bridge, the bridge being named by Governor Richard Bourke to honour Henry Petty-Fitzmaurice, 3rd Marquess of Lansdowne (1780-1863), a Whig politician. 

The suburb's name has occasionally in the past appeared on maps with a spelling of 'Landsdowne'.

The area now designated as the suburb of Lansdowne was subdivided into residential lots in the 1880s and the roads formed but not sealed, but very few houses were built. The Metropolitan Water Sewerage and Drainage Board subsequently acquired the land and it remained unused, with its network of unused streets sitting in a landscape of grassland and stands of trees.

Because the area designated as the suburb of Lansdowne is largely the undeveloped land previously owned by the Metropolitan Water Sewerage and Drainage Board, it consists almost entirely of parkland.

In the 1940s Henry Lawson Drive, intended as a scenic route, was built through Lansdowne from the Hume Highway at Woodville Road to Milperra Road at Milperra Bridge.

In December 1960-January 1961 the sixth Australian Scout Jamboree was held on the site, and in September 1970 a Scout "jamborette" was held on the land as part of the celebrations of the 75th anniversary of the proclamation of Bankstown Municipality.

In 1974, the Commonwealth Department of Urban and Regional Development acquired for regional open space the land owned by the metropolitan Water Sewerage and Drainage Board, and transferred ownership to Bankstown Council. This is the area now occupied by Mirrmabeena Regional Park. In the following years the park was landscaped and equipped for recreational use. This included the creation of Lake Gillawarna, and other ponds full of aquatic life, native walks and pedestrian/cycle ways, playgrounds and barbecue and picnic facilities.

Transport
Lansdowne Bridge was built in 1834-35 from stone quarried on the banks of Georges River at what is now East Hills. It replaced a hardwood bridge called Bowler's Bridge named after the keeper of the nearby Bowler's Inn, and is one of the finest works by Scottish stonemason David Lennox (1788-1873). Lennox arrived in Sydney in 1832 and was made Superintendent of Bridges with the task of replacing hardwood bridges that were frequently swept away in floods. 

Since 1958, with the construction immediately downstream of a second bridge over Prospect Creek , Lansdowne Bridge has carried only northbound traffic of the Hume Highway.

The Meccano Set is a well-known landmark, consisting of an overhead tubular steel framework holding traffic lights and road signage, straddling the intersection of the Hume Highway, Henry Lawson Drive and Woodville Road. The original structure was installed in 1962, and a near-identical replacement structure was installed in 2019.

Parks
Lansdowne consists nearly entirely of parkland, made up of:
 Mirambeena Regional Park
 Lansdowne Park, which is a road cycling circuit.

References

Suburbs of Sydney
City of Canterbury-Bankstown